I Only Have Eyes for You is the third album by Lester Bowie recorded for ECM and the debut album of his "Brass Fantasy" group. It was released in 1985 and features performances by Bowie, Vincent Chancey, Craig Harris, Steve Turre, Malachi Thompson, Stanton Davis, Bob Stewart and Phillip Wilson.

Reception
The Allmusic review by Scott Yanow awarded the album 3 stars, stating, "The music is both whimsical and explorative, making for a colorful set".

Track listing
 "I Only Have Eyes for You" (Al Dubin, Harry Warren) - 10:32  
 "Think" (Bruce Purse) - 1:31  
 "Lament" (Thompson) - 13:55  
 "Coming Back, Jamaica" - 5:17  
 "Nonet" (Stewart) - 14:32  
 "When the Spirit Returns" - 7:44  
All compositions by Lester Bowie except as indicated

Personnel
Lester Bowie: trumpet
Vincent Chancey: French horn
Craig Harris: trombone
Steve Turre: trombone 
Malachi Thompson: trumpet 
Stanton Davis: trumpet, flugelhorn 
Bob Stewart: tuba
Bruce Purse: trumpet
Phillip Wilson: drums

References

1985 albums
ECM Records albums
Lester Bowie albums
Albums produced by Manfred Eicher